Carlos Tschudi Simpson (born 30 June 1962) is an American mathematician, specializing in algebraic geometry.

Simpson received his Ph.D. in 1987 from Harvard University, where he was supervised by Wilfried Schmid; his thesis was titled Systems of Hodge Bundles and Uniformization. He became a professor at the University of Toulouse III (Paul Sabatier University) and then at the University of Nice. He is research director of the Centre national de la recherche scientifique.

He works on moduli spaces of vector bundles, higher non-abelian de Rham cohomology (Hodge theory), the theory of higher categories and computer verification of mathematical proofs (e.g. verification of proofs within Zermelo–Fraenkel set theory using Coq). In his Ph.D. dissertation, Simpson studied the notion of system of Hodge bundles, which can be seen as a special case of the higher dimensional generalization of Higgs bundles introduced earlier by Nigel Hitchin.  The Simpson correspondence (or the Corlette-Simpson correspondence, named after Kevin Corlette and Simpson) is a correspondence between Higgs bundles and representations of the fundamental group of a smooth, complex algebraic curve.

The Deligne–Simpson Problem, an algebraic problem associated with monodromy matrices, is named after Carlos Simpson and Pierre Deligne.

Simpson was an Invited Speaker with talk Nonabelian Hodge theory at the International Congress of Mathematicians in 1990 at Kyoto. In 2015 he received the Sophie Germain Prize.

Selected publications

References

External links

1962 births
Living people
20th-century American mathematicians
21st-century American mathematicians
Harvard University alumni
Academic staff of the University of Toulouse
Academic staff of Côte d'Azur University
Algebraic geometers
Topologists